Otego Township is one of twenty townships in Fayette County, Illinois, USA.  As of the 2010 census, its population was 1,511 and it contained 666 housing units.  Its name changed from Cumberland township on September 24, 1860.  Overcup Church is located in this township.

Geography

Cities, towns, villages
 Brownstown (south three-quarters)

Unincorporated towns
 Confidence
(This list is based on USGS data and may include former settlements.)

Cemeteries
The township contains these six cemeteries: Arm Prairie, Griffith, Mitchell Family, Morton, Pilcher and Winslow Pilcher.

Major highways
  Interstate 70
  U.S. Route 40
  Illinois Route 185

Demographics

School districts
 Brownstown Community Unit School District 201
 Vandalia Community Unit School District 203

Political districts
 Illinois's 19th congressional district
 State House District 102
 State Senate District 51

References
 
 United States Census Bureau 2007 TIGER/Line Shapefiles
 United States National Atlas

External links
 City-Data.com
 Illinois State Archives

Townships in Fayette County, Illinois
Populated places established in 1859
Townships in Illinois
1859 establishments in Illinois